Scott D. Newhard (born August 23, 1951) is an American politician.

Newhard was born in Anamosa, Iowa and graduated from Anamosa Community High School in 1969. He served in the Iowa National Guard and went to Iowa Wesleyan University. Newhard served in the Iowa House of Representatives from 1973 to 1979 and was a Democrat.

Notes

1951 births
Living people
People from Anamosa, Iowa
Military personnel from Iowa
Democratic Party members of the Iowa House of Representatives